The Ruhmannsberg is a mountain near Hauzenberg, a town in the  Lower Bavarian county of Passau. Its summit is 863 metres high. At the foot of the mountain lie the villages of Kollersberg, Germannsdorf, Röhrendobel and Ruhmannsdorf. Nearby is the mountain of Staffelberg. On the Ruhmannsberg are many footpaths and forest tracks. The mountain is covered by woods and meadows.

References 

Mountains under 1000 metres
Mountains of Bavaria
Mountains of the Bavarian Forest
Passau (district)